Miguel Caetano Dias (9 July 1854 - 26 July 1936) was a medical doctor best known for his roles as chief of health services in Goa (Estado da Índia Portuguesa) and director of the Medical School of Goa (Escola Médico-Cirúrgica de Goa). In these roles, he was widely recognised for waging successful vaccination and sanitation campaigns, and was also instrumental in advocating against the closure of the medical school.

Early life 
Dias was one of five children born to Manuel Francisco Dias and Escolastica Fernandes e Dias in St Estevam , an island in Goa, India. The humble circumstances of his childhood are often mentioned in later accounts of his achievements.

His brother João Vicente Santana Dias, a Major in the Portuguese Army, is credited with helping him enrol at the Faculty of Medicine of the University of Lisbon where he graduated with distinction in 1882. Upon graduation, he joined the Portuguese Army as part of the military medical cadre in Mozambique.

Career 
After spending five years in Mozambique, Dias was transferred to Goa in 1888. Around this time, the Portuguese authorities were seriously considering closing the Medical School of Goa with an inspection conducted by the Portuguese doctor Cesar Gomes Barbosa in 1897 recommending shutting the school down permanently. However, in 1902 the Portuguese government finally voted to keep the school open with arguments put forth by the prominent physician and politician Miguel Bombarda that the school would be the ideal place to train doctors for the colonies. While Bombarda did not acknowledge it, his arguments were previously put forth by native born Goan doctors including Dias himself who wrote in 1902.

This vote coincided with the mandate of Dias who was appointed the director of the health services in Goa and director of the Medical School of Goa in 1902, only the second native born Goan to achieve this position in the colonial administration after his predecessor Rafael Pereira from Benaulim, Salcette. Though a native Christian, Dias was not from the elite social circles from which his predecessors had originated and is recognised as having worked his way towards social and professional recognition through personal effort and merit, in what was at the time, a highly stratified society.

Dias was a strong proponent of modern European medicine and vaccination in particular, as opposed to the variolation or inoculation techniques that were common among the local population. He recommended the creation of vaccine parks in different districts despite the challenge this was to local beliefs about ritual and body pollution. He often condemned the latter in his writings.

His anti-plague campaigns and sanitary policies played a large part in the adoption of modern European medicine across Goan society. His tenure ended in 1913 and he was succeeded by José Maria da Costa Álvares.

Dias later became actively involved in politics and was appointed the President of the first Provincial Congress of Goa and also mayor of the Municipal Council of Ilhas.

Awards and recognition 
In recognition for his services to public health, Dias was made a Knight of the Military Order of Aviz (Cavaleiro, Official e Comendador da Real Ordem Militar de S. Bento de Aviz).

A bust of Dias was installed in the premises of the Medical School of Goa and was later shifted to the front of his residence upon his death, where it still stands today. The inscription on the bust reads "Ao Grande Cirurgião. Homenagem Dos Seus Concidadãos (To the great surgeon. Homage from your fellow citizens)"

Luís de Menezes Braganza the prominent Indian journalist and anti-colonial activist from Goa often wrote of contemporaries he admired in Pracasha, a Konkani language daily. Of Dias, he wrote that though Dias did not come from an aristocratic family, he served his people and his country well. He also wrote that Dias was not very polished in his manners and etiquette but the good of his people was always uppermost in his mind.

Personal life 
Dias married Maria Veronica da Silva and had eight children Victor Manuel Dias, Luis Gonzaga Bismarck Dias, Alvaro Jose Maria da Silva Dias, Antonio Francisco Dias, Ernesto Dias, Albertina Lavinia Escolastica Dias e Afonso, Aurea Dias e Lobo and Alice Leonor Brigida Dias e Fialho.

A number of his children went on to achieve individual renown in their own fields of study and practice.

His bought the Casa da Moeda in Panjim, Goa where his descendants continue to live and opposite which his statue is installed. He also purchased a large tract of land in Naroa, an island along the river Mandovi opposite his home island of St. Estevam, where he built a Chapel.

Death 
Dias died in 1936 and was buried in his native St Estevam where his family grave occupies a prominent place in the front of the cemetery.

References

1854 births
1936 deaths
People from Panaji
19th-century Indian medical doctors
20th-century Indian medical doctors
Medical doctors from Goa
Goan society
Goans in science and technology
Goan Catholics